Rafael Lozano Muñoz (born January 25, 1970, in Córdoba, Andalusia) is a former boxer from Spain.

Professional career 
Known as "Balita", Lozano turned pro in 2001.  In 2006, he challenged Brahim Asloum for the WBA Intercontinental Flyweight Title (lost on TKO).

Amateur career 
1992 – Participated in the Summer Olympics (light flyweight)
Defeated Fana Thwala (South Africa) points
Defeated Eric Griffin (United States) points
Lost to Rogelio Marcelo (Cuba) points
1996 – Bronze Medal at the European Amateur Boxing Championships (Light Flyweight) in Vejle, Denmark
Defeated Yaşar Giritli (Turkey) points
Defeated Peter Baláž (Slovakia) points
Lost to Oleg Kiryukhin (Ukraine) points
1996 – Bronze medal at the Summer Olympics (light flyweight) in Atlanta, Georgia
Defeated Joseph Benhard (Namibia) points
Defeated Masibulele Makepula (South Africa) points
Defeated Masara La Paene (Indonesia) points
Lost to Mansueto Velasco (Philippines) points
2000 – Silver Medal at the Summer Olympics (light flyweight) in Sydney, Australia
Defeated Danilo Lerio (Philippines) points
Defeated Suleiman Bilali (Kenya) points
Defeated Kim Un-Chol (North Korea) points
Lost to Brahim Asloum (France) points

External links
 
sports-reference

1970 births
Living people
Olympic boxers of Spain
Boxers at the 1992 Summer Olympics
Boxers at the 1996 Summer Olympics
Boxers at the 2000 Summer Olympics
Olympic silver medalists for Spain
Olympic bronze medalists for Spain
Sportspeople from Córdoba, Spain
Olympic medalists in boxing
Spanish male boxers
Medalists at the 2000 Summer Olympics
Medalists at the 1996 Summer Olympics
Light-flyweight boxers
Competitors at the 1997 Mediterranean Games
Mediterranean Games medalists in boxing
Mediterranean Games bronze medalists for Spain